Ramona Pop (born 31 October 1977) is a Romanian-born German politician of the Alliance '90/The Greens party who has been serving as chairwoman of the Federation of German Consumer Organisations (VZBV) since 2022. She previously served as a deputy mayor of Berlin and Senator for Economy, Energy, and Enterprises (Senatorin für Wirtschaft, Energie und Betriebe) from 2016 until 2021.

Early life and education
Pop was born in Timișoara, and grew up in Romania until her family, of mixed Romanian and Romanian German origin, moved to Germany in 1988. In 1997 she completed high school. Pop studied political science in Münster and later at the Free University Berlin, graduating from its Otto-Suhr-Institut.

Political career
Pop has been a member of the Green party since 1997. In the 2001 state elections, she was elected into the Abgeordnetenhaus of Berlin. In parliament, she first served as the Green Party’s parliamentary group on youth policies. From 2009, she led the parliamentary group alongside Volker Ratzmann. Pop succeeded Renate Künast as leading candidate after Künast had made mistakes in the election campaign for 2011 Berlin state elections.

As one of her state's representatives at the Bundesrat, Pop served on the Committee on Economic Affairs.

Pop was a Green Party delegate to the Federal Convention for the purpose of electing the President of Germany in 2017.

Other activities

Regulatory agencies
 Federal Network Agency for Electricity, Gas, Telecommunications, Post and Railway (BNetzA), Member of the Advisory Board

Corporate boards
 Berliner Stadtreinigung (BSR), Ex-Officio Chairwoman of the Supervisory Board (2017–2021)
 Berliner Verkehrsbetriebe (BVG), Ex-Officio Chairwoman of the Supervisory Board (2017–2021)
 Berliner Wasserbetriebe (BWB), Ex-Officio Chairwoman of the Supervisory Board (2017–2021)
 Investitionsbank Berlin (IBB), Ex-Officio Member of the Supervisory Board (2017–2021)
 Messe Berlin, Member of the Supervisory Board
 Deutsche Klassenlotterie Berlin (DKLB), Member of the Supervisory Board

Non-profit organizations
 Berlin School of Economics and Law (HWR), Member of the Board of Trustees (since 2017)

References

External links
Official Website of Ramona Pop
Ramona Pop at the Abgeordnetenhaus of Berlin
Ramona Pop at the Berlin parliamentary faction of Alliance '90/The Greens

1977 births
Living people
Alliance 90/The Greens politicians
Senators of Berlin
Members of the Abgeordnetenhaus of Berlin
Politicians from Berlin
Romanian emigrants to Germany
Free University of Berlin alumni